Notiocoelotes is a genus of spiders in the family Agelenidae. It was first described in 2008 by Wang, Xu & Li. , it contains 13 Asian species.

Species

Notiocoelotes comprises the following species:
Notiocoelotes laosensis Wang, Xu & Li, 2008
Notiocoelotes lingulatus Wang, Xu & Li, 2008
Notiocoelotes maoganensis Zhao & Li, 2016
Notiocoelotes membranaceus Liu & Li, 2010
Notiocoelotes orbiculatus Liu & Li, 2010
Notiocoelotes palinitropus (Zhu & Wang, 1994)
Notiocoelotes parvitriangulus Liu, Li & Pham, 2010
Notiocoelotes pseudolingulatus Liu & Li, 2010
Notiocoelotes pseudovietnamensis Liu, Li & Pham, 2010
Notiocoelotes qiongzhongensis Zhao & Li, 2016
Notiocoelotes sparus (Dankittipakul, Chami-Kranon & Wang, 2005)
Notiocoelotes spirellus Liu & Li, 2010
Notiocoelotes vietnamensis Wang, Xu & Li, 2008

References

Agelenidae
Araneomorphae genera
Spiders of Asia